Noa is a Japanese singer, model, and television personality associated with No Doubt Tracks.

Career

After winning an audition to indies label No Doubt Tracks, Noa debuted in 2007 as a featured artist on the compilation album Ride On West under the name Kaoru. In 2008, she released her first studio album Lucy Love as a tie-in to a Californian fashion brand.

Discography

Studio albums

Extended plays

References

21st-century Japanese singers
21st-century Japanese women singers
Japanese female models
Japanese women pop singers
Living people
Year of birth missing (living people)